Jason Dawson (born 9 February 1971) is an English former professional footballer who played as a forward.

Career
Dawson came through Port Vale's Youth Training Scheme and went on to sign with Rochdale in July 1989. He scored on his debut away at Cambridge United. He scored two goals in 27 Fourth Division games in the 1989–90 campaign, helping Terry Dolan's "Dale" to a 12th-place finish. He added five more goals from 28 league matches during the 1990–91 season, with Rochdale again posting a 12th-place finish, before he was released from Spotland Stadium by Dave Sutton.

He signed with Conference club Macclesfield Town on a free transfer and took up employment as a coalman. He made his debut for the "Silkmen" as a substitute away at Colchester United on 17 August 1991. He made just five league starts at Moss Rose, scoring three goals from a total of 21 league and cup appearances over the 1990–91 season. He was then released and played one game for Leek Town, a 0–0 draw with Bangor City on 22 February 1992. He moved on to Stafford Rangers in 1992.

Career statistics
Source:

References

1971 births
Living people
Sportspeople from Burslem
English footballers
Association football forwards
Port Vale F.C. players
Rochdale A.F.C. players
Macclesfield Town F.C. players
Leek Town F.C. players
Stafford Rangers F.C. players
English Football League players
National League (English football) players
Northern Premier League players